John Weston Hutchins (June 14, 1854March 5, 1943) was a Michigan politician.

Early life
Hutchins was born on June 14, 1854.

Career
Hutchins was elected to the Michigan Senate on November 5, 1912. He served from January 1, 1913 to 1914. Hutchins was a member of the Progressive Party. Hutchins was not re-elected in 1914.

Personal life
Hutchins was married to Sarah Elizabeth Lambert.

Death
Hutchins died on March 5, 1943.

References

1854 births
1943 deaths
Michigan Progressives (1912)
Michigan state senators
20th-century American politicians